Mario Andrés Rebollo Bergero (born 8 December 1964) is a Uruguayan football coach and former player. He most recently was the assistant manager of the Uruguay national team.

Playing career
Rebollo is a former Uruguayan international. He made his international debut on 27 September 1988 in a 2–1 win against Ecuador.

Coaching career
Rebollo is an assistant manager at Uruguay national team to Óscar Tabárez since 2006.

Career statistics

International

References

 Profile at BDFA 
 
 Profile at Tenfield Digital 

1964 births
Living people
Uruguayan footballers
Uruguayan expatriate footballers
Montevideo Wanderers F.C. players
C.A. Bella Vista players
C.A. Rentistas players
C.A. Cerro players
Central Español players
San Lorenzo de Almagro footballers
Cienciano footballers
Colo-Colo footballers
C.D. Cuenca footballers
Chilean Primera División players
Argentine Primera División players
Expatriate footballers in Chile
Expatriate footballers in Argentina
Expatriate footballers in Ecuador
Expatriate footballers in Peru

Association football defenders
Uruguay international footballers